Anderias Hiler Eduardus Nabunome (12 April 1968 – 12 October 2020) was an Indonesian long-distance runner. He competed in the men's 5000 metres and the 10,000 metres at the 1988 Summer Olympics.
He won 1992 Asian Marathon Championships in Bandung.

References

External links
 

1968 births
2020 deaths
Athletes (track and field) at the 1988 Summer Olympics
Indonesian male long-distance runners
Olympic athletes of Indonesia
Southeast Asian Games medalists in athletics
Southeast Asian Games gold medalists for Indonesia
Competitors at the 1987 Southeast Asian Games
Sportspeople from East Nusa Tenggara